The Mindanao montane forest mouse (Apomys insignis)  is a species of rodent in the family Muridae.
It is found only in the Philippines.

References

Rats of Asia
Apomys
Endemic fauna of the Philippines
Fauna of Mindanao
Rodents of the Philippines
Mammals described in 1905
Taxonomy articles created by Polbot